Sir Edward Seymour Hicks (30 January 1871 – 6 April 1949), better known as Seymour Hicks, was a British actor, music hall performer, playwright, screenwriter, theatre manager and producer.  He became well known for writing, starring in and producing Edwardian musical comedy.  Beginning in 1913, however, he had a significant film career.  Hicks began in film during the silent era and continued to act in sound films.

His first role was for his own screenplay adaptation of A Christmas Carol, titled Scrooge, alongside William Lugg, J. C. Buckstone, and his wife Ellaline Terriss.  His next film role was in the title role of the film biography David Garrick.

Hicks formed his own production company in 1923.  The same year, he made his director's début, alongside Alfred Hitchcock, in Always Tell Your Wife although no director was credited on film itself.  He wrote the screenplay for this, as well as for several films in the early 1930s.  Hicks directed two more films: Sleeping Partners in 1930 and Glamour in 1931. Later notable films included The Lambeth Walk in 1939  and Busman's Honeymoon in 1940. He made his last supporting role in Silent Dust shortly before his death in 1949.

Filmography

Note: The source for the film appearances is the British Film Institute.

References

Male actor filmographies
British filmographies